2009 Tochigi S.C. season

League table

Domestic results

J2 League 
As of the 5 December 2009, these are all the matches they played for 2009 season.
Tochigi SC results for 2009. (Japanese)

Emperor's Cup

Player statistics 

Emperor's Cup data reference

References

External links 
 J. League official site

Tochigi S.C.
Tochigi SC seasons